Jean-François Zygel (born 23 November 1960) is a French pianist, improviser, composer and improvisation teacher for piano at the Conservatoire de Paris.

Born  in Paris, he is also known for his work in introducing classical music on television and radio.

Zygel's music is nourished by synagogue cantillation. Two of his great-grandfathers were hazzanim in Poland.

Awards
 Chevalier de la Légion d'honneur (2015).
 Chevaliers of the Ordre des Arts et des Lettres.
 Chevalier de l'Ordre national du Mérite (2006).

On France Inter
At the beginning of 2015, France Inter entrusted him with a weekly programme entitled La Preuve par Z. The composer evokes and explains the great composers, with long excerpts from concerts in support.

On France Télévisions
On 31 August 2017, Zygel presented "Zygel Académie" on France 2, a show where celebrities discover classical music. It has 601,000 viewers, or 7.3% of the audience.

Publications
 Quand du stérile hiver a resplendi l'ennui ... Conditions d'existence du langage musical, in Le Débat, issue 82, November-December 1994, .

Bibliography
 Interview by B. Dermoncourt, in Classica-Repertoire, February 2008, .
 "Z comme Jean-François Zygel : la musique sort de sa boîte", in Improvisation so piano, Jean-Pierre Thiollet, Neva Éditions, 2017, .

References

External links
 La Leçon de Musique ( Zygel) - Chopin et la mélodie (YouTube)

1960 births
20th-century French composers
21st-century French composers
Academic staff of the Conservatoire de Paris
Chevaliers of the Légion d'honneur
Chevaliers of the Ordre des Arts et des Lettres
Conservatoire de Paris alumni
Knights of the Ordre national du Mérite
Living people
French radio presenters
French television presenters
Musicians from Paris